Yobou Jean Noel Thome (born 10 October 1995) is an Ivorian former footballer who is last known to have played as a defender for Gällivare.

Career

Club career

As a youth player, Thome joined the Qatari Aspire Academy. At the age of 15, he almost joined the youth academy of Spanish La Liga side Barcelona. Before the 2014 season, he signed for Kruoja in Lithuania. In 2014, Thome signed for Danish top flight club FC Vestsjælland, where he made 8 appearances and scored 0 goals and suffered relegation to the Danish second tier. On 17 August 2014, he debuted for FC Vestsjælland during a 2-0 win over Silkeborg. Before the second half of 2015–16, Thome signed for Al-Ahli Tripoli in Libya. In 2016, he signed for Congolese top flight club DCMP. Before the 2017 season, he signed for Gällivare in the Swedish fourth tier.

International career

Thome represented Ivory Coast at the 2011 FIFA U-17 World Cup.

References

External links

 Jean Thome at playmakerstats.com

Ivory Coast youth international footballers
Ivorian footballers
Association football defenders
Living people
1995 births
Expatriate footballers in Libya
Expatriate men's footballers in Denmark
Expatriate footballers in Qatar
Expatriate footballers in Lithuania
Al-Ahli SC (Tripoli) players
FC Vestsjælland players
Danish Superliga players
Ivorian expatriate sportspeople in Qatar
Ivorian expatriate sportspeople in Denmark
A Lyga players
Daring Club Motema Pembe players
Ivorian expatriate sportspeople in Sweden
Ivorian expatriate footballers
Expatriate footballers in Sweden
People from Divo, Ivory Coast